The Web Hypertext Application Technology Working Group (WHATWG) is a community of people interested in evolving HTML and related technologies. The WHATWG was founded by individuals from Apple Inc., the Mozilla Foundation and Opera Software, leading Web browser vendors, in 2004.

The central organizational membership and control of WHATWG today – its "Steering Group" – consists of Apple, Mozilla, Google, and Microsoft.  WHATWG community members work with the editor of the specifications to ensure correct implementation.

History
The WHATWG was formed in response to the slow development of World Wide Web Consortium (W3C) Web standards and W3C's decision to abandon HTML in favor of XML-based technologies. The WHATWG mailing list was announced on 4 June 2004, two days after the initiatives of a joint Opera–Mozilla position paper had been voted down by the W3C members at the W3C Workshop on Web Applications and Compound Documents.

On 10 April 2007, the Mozilla Foundation, Apple, and Opera Software proposed that the new HTML working group of the W3C adopt the WHATWG's HTML5 as the starting point of its work and name its future deliverable as "HTML5" (though the WHATWG specification was later renamed HTML Living Standard).

On 9 May 2007, the new HTML working group of the W3C resolved to do that. An Internet Explorer platform architect from Microsoft was invited but did not join, citing the lack of a patent policy to ensure all specifications can be implemented on a royalty-free basis. Since then, the W3C and the WHATWG had been developing HTML independently, at times causing specifications to diverge.

In 2017, the WHATWG established an intellectual property rights agreement that includes a patent policy. This spurred a renewed attempt to allow the W3C and the WHATWG to work together on specifications. In 2019, the W3C and WHATWG agreed to a memorandum of understanding where development of HTML and DOM specifications would be done principally in the WHATWG.

The editor has significant control over the specification, but the community can influence the decisions of the editor. In one case, editor Ian Hickson proposed replacing the  tag with a more generic  tag, but the community disagreed and the change was reverted.

Transition of HTML Publication to WHATWG

On 28 May 2019, the W3C announced that WHATWG would be the sole publisher of the HTML and DOM standards. The W3C and WHATWG had been publishing competing standards since 2012. While the W3C standard was identical to the WHATWG in 2007 the standards have since progressively diverged due to different design decisions. The WHATWG "Living Standard" had been the de facto web standard for some time.

Specifications
The WHATWG publishes a number of standards that form a substantial portion of the web platform including:
 The HTML Living Standard (sometimes informally called HTML5). The HTML specification has been a living document without version numbers since 2011. It includes both HTML, the core markup language for the web, and a number of related APIs.
 The DOM Standard, defines how the Document Object Model on the web is supposed to work and replaces W3C DOM level 3. For example, it replaces mutation events with mutation observers.
 Fetch Standard, which "defines requests, responses, and the process that binds them: fetching." The fetch standard defines the 'fetch' JavaScript API, and supersedes the HTML5 fetch functionality, CORS and the HTTP Origin header semantics.
 The Streams Standard provides APIs for creating, composing, and consuming streams of data. These streams are designed to map efficiently to low-level I/O primitives, and allow easy composition with built-in backpressure and queueing. On top of streams, the web platform can build higher-level abstractions, such as filesystem or socket APIs, while at the same time users can use the supplied tools to build their own streams which integrate well with those of the web platform.
 The Encoding Standard defines how character encodings such as Windows-1252 and UTF-8 are handled in web browsers and is intended to replace the IETF encodings registry.
 The MIME type sniffing standard defines how MIME types are supposed to be sniffed in web browsers.
 The URL standard defines how URLs are supposed to be parsed in web browsers.

References

External links

HTML5
Internet Standard organizations
Organizations established in 2004
Standards organizations in the United States
Web applications
Working groups
World Wide Web